The 2017 Melbourne Storm season was the 20th in the club's history. They competed in the 2017 NRL season and at the end of the Regular season had finished in 1st place earning them their third legitimate minor premiership. The team was coached by Craig Bellamy, coaching the club for his 15th consecutive season. Melbourne Storm were also captained by Cameron Smith, who has been the sole captain for the team since 2008—making this his 10th consecutive season. Cameron Smith broke a number of league, club and personal records throughout the 2017 season including the NRL games record for the most games played, league record for the most wins as a captain, a personal best for the most points in a game and also scored his 2000th career point and 1000th career goal, the first time any player has achieved this.

With the Storm finishing first, they received a home Qualifying final against the Parramatta Eels which they won giving them a week off and a home Preliminary Final. The Storm defeated the Brisbane Broncos 30-0 to qualify them for the 2017 NRL Grand Final against the North Queensland Cowboys. Melbourne Storm dominated the Grand Final to earn them their 3rd official Premiership 34 - 6.

Season summary 
Pre-season- New recruits took part in Melbourne Storm IDQ camp for pre season training before New Years. Brandon Smith was awarded the IDQ Iron bar. 
 Auckland Nines: The club commenced their season competing in the annual Auckland Nines competition. After winning two of their three pool games they qualified for the finals. The Storm defeated the North Queensland Cowboys in the Quarter-finals before going down to the Sydney Roosters in the Semi-finals and ending their tournament. The squad was co-captained by Kenny Bromwich and Young Tonumaipea, with Cameron Munster and Brodie Croft making the team of the tournament.
 11 February: In the Storm's first trial game they came back to win 30–18 after trailing 18-0 at halftime.
 Round 1: Ryley Jacks and Josh Addo Carr make their Melbourne Storm debuts against the Canterbury Bulldogs. Will Chambers also played his 150th Game.
 Round 2: The Storm defeat the New Zealand Warriors in very wet conditions 26–10. Cameron Smith scored 5 goals from 5 attempts, an impressive display given the conditions. The 10 points he scored also took him past 2000 career NRL points becoming the first forward, the first Queenslander, and just the fifth player in history to have achieved the milestone. Vincent Leualai and Joe Stimson make their playing debuts for the storm.
 Round 4: After a terrible start, which saw the Storm down 14-0 at the 38th minute mark of the game, the Storm scored 22 unanswered points to come back to win 22-14 against Wests Tigers.
 Round 5: Melbourne defeat Penrith in their biggest win this season to date. The win was notable because it was Cameron Smith's 238th first grade win, surpassing Darren Lockyer's record and therefore making him the most successful player in history. Mark Nicholls made his debut for the Storm and Tui Kamikamica made his NRL playing debut. In addition, following this victory, Melbourne Storm remained the only undefeated side in the competition.
 4 April: Cooper Cronk announces that he will leave Melbourne Storm at the conclusion of the 2017 season and relocate to Sydney for personal reasons. At this time, he did not make it clear as to which club he will continue his career at or if indeed he will continue at all, as he will be 34 years of age by 2018.
 Round 8: In the annual ANZAC Day Game, Melbourne Storm defeated the New Zealand Warriors 20–14 in a hard-fought, even contest.
 26 April: The ANZAC Test squad is named with three Storm players named to take part. Will Chambers, Cooper Cronk and Cameron Smith as captain in his 50th test match for Australia.
 Round 9: Melbourne defeated St George Illawarra 34–22 in the Storm first win in Wollongong since 2005 to move 2 game clear on top of the NRL table. Cameron Smith also broke the all-time league goal kicking record during the game and Cameron Munster played his 50th Game.
 Round 10: Melbourne travelled to Suncorp stadium Brisbane for a "Home" game. The game was quite extraordinary for its high scoring in which Melbourne scored an NRL record equalling 36 points in a losing game with the Gold Coast Titans scoring two late tries to score 38 points. Cameron Smith also scored 12 points which is the highest number of points in a game thus far. Billy Slater also scored his 700th career point with his try.
 Round 13: The Storm consolidate top spot on the table with  their biggest win of the season to date defeating the Newcastle Knights 40–12. Felise Kaufusi played his 50th game and Brandon Smith made his playing debut and also scored his first try.
 12 June: State of Origin game 2 teams are announced with 5 Storm players making the Queensland team. Cameron Smith (Captain), Cooper Cronk and Will Chambers all played in Game 1 while Billy Slater has been recalled after 2 years on the sideline due to injury. In addition, Tim Glasby was also announced to make his debut.
 Round 15: With many players missing due to State of Origin duty, a number of players made their return to the side including Curtis Scott making his first appearance in 2017, and Brodie Croft his first appearance in almost 12 months, also Mark Nicholls and Joe Stimson. Dean Britt made his playing debut. The game was very close against the equally depleted Cowboys which ended up going into Golden Point extra time and it was Brodie Croft that kicked the winning field goal.
 Round 16: Jahrome Hughes makes his debut for the Storm in the team's narrow 1 point Golden Point loss to the Roosters.
 Round 17: Melbourne defeated Brisbane 42–12 in their biggest win of the season thus far.
 3 July: Stet of Origin Game 3 teams are announced with six Storm players making the Queensland team. Cameron Smith (Captain), Cooper Cronk, Will Chambers, Billy Slater and Tim Glasby all return from Game 2 with Cameron Munster announced to make his debut.
 Round 18: An undermanned Storm, (due to six players being absent on State of Origin duties), lose their fourth game of the season 22–6 to the Parramatta Eels with Nate Myles making his Storm debut.
 Round 21: Cameron Smith runs out for his 350th Game placing him equal second on the all-time list with Terry Lamb. The Storm had a 40–6 win over the Sea Eagles the biggest win to date over the Sea Eagles
 Round 23: The Storm narrowly defeated the Sydney Roosters to move three games clear on top of the ladder. The win was notable for a Penalty Try awarded to Suliasi Vunivalu in the first half, and in particular 12 of the Storms 16 points coming off penalties.
 Round 24 - The Storm thump the Newcastle Knights 44–12 in the club's highest scoring game this season to date. Brodie Croft also became the first Storm player to score 3 tries in a game this season. The win also secured Storm the 2017 Minor Premiership.
 Round 25 - Melbourne Storm demolish the South Sydney Rabbitohs 64–6 in their 5th biggest win in their history. The Storm scored 11 tries with Cameron Smith kicking 9 out of 9 goals and scoring a try this gave him 22 points for the game, his highest ever total in a single game and this was also his 250th win as captain. The win was by far the biggest of the season so far and it was also the largest score so far. Suliasi Vunivalu and Josh Addo -Carr also scored 3 tries apiece. 
 Round 26 - Melbourne Storm defeat the Canberra Raiders 32–6 in the final home and away game of the season. This game was notable as Cameron Smith played his 355th game which drew him level with Darren Lockyer's NRL record for the most games played. In addition, it was also Cooper Cronk's final home and away game for the Storm, Nelson Asofa-Solomona played his 50th game and the Storm were awarded the J. J. Giltinan Shield for winning the Minor Premiership following the game. 
 Finals week 1 - Cameron Smith sets a new NRL record for the most games played, when he ran out for his 356th Game surpassing Darren Lockyer.
 Finals week 3 - Melbourne Storm Qualify for their second consecutive Grand Final defeating the Brisbane Broncos 30–0. Cameron Smith also scored his 1000th Goal during the game becoming the first NRL player to do so.
 Finals week 4 - 2017 NRL Grand Final - The Melbourne Storm defeat the North Queensland Cowboys 34–6 to win the 2017 Premiership, Billy Slater claimed his second Clive Churchill Medal. The match was notable for it being Cooper Cronk's final game for the Melbourne Storm. Other departing players from the Grand Final side were Tohu Harris, Slade Griffin and Jordan McLean.

Milestone games

Fixtures

Pre-season 

Source:

Regular season

Source:

NOTE: All Melbourne Storm home games in 2017 were at AAMI Park with the exception of the Round 10 Home game against Gold Coast Titans which was played at Suncorp Stadium in Brisbane. The game was part of a double header with the Brisbane Broncos vs. Manly Sea Eagles game being played immediately after.

 GP = Golden Point Extra Time
 (pen) = Penalty Try

Finals

Ladder

2017 Coaching Staff
 Craig Bellamy - Head Coach
 Adam O’Brien - Assistant Coach
 Jason Ryles - Assistant Coach
 Eric Smith - U/20s Head Coach
 Marc Brentnall – Development Coach
 Aaron Bellamy – Development Coach
 Frank Ponissi - Football Director
 Nick Maxwell - Leadership Coach
 Craig McRae – Kicking & Catching Coach

2017 Squad
List current as of 3 July 2017
(a): This column denotes the previous RL club the player was signed to and played first grade RL for. If they are yet to debut then this is stipulated. If they were merely signed to the club but did not play then it is not counted.

2017 Premiership Team

Player movements
Source:

Losses
 Blake Green to Manly-Warringah Sea Eagles
 Ben Hampton to North Queensland Cowboys
 Richie Kennar to Canterbury-Bankstown Bulldogs
 Josh Kerr to St George Illawarra Dragons
 Marika Koroibete to Melbourne Rebels (rugby union)
 Ryan Morgan to St. Helens R.F.C.
 Kevin Proctor to Gold Coast Titans
 Ben Nakubuwai to Gold Coast Titans
 Francis Tualau to Canterbury-Bankstown Bulldogs
 Tony Tumusa to released
 Matthew White to released
 Dean Britt to South Sydney Rabbitohs (mid season)

Gains

 Josh Addo-Carr from Wests Tigers
 Jahrome Hughes from  North Queensland Cowboys 
 Ryley Jacks from Sunshine Coast Falcons 
 Vincent Leuluai from Sydney Roosters
 Brandon Smith from North Queensland Cowboys
 Nate Myles from Manly-Warringah Sea Eagles (mid season)
 Robbie Rochow from South Sydney Rabbitohs (mid season)

Representative honours
The following players have played a first grade representative match in 2017. (C) = Captain

1: Rugby League International Weekend: consisted of four games being played over the weekend of 5–7 May 2017. This included the 2017 Anzac Test (Australia vs. New Zealand) and the three Pacific Tests (Fiji vs. Tonga, Papua New Guinea vs. Cook Islands and England vs. Samoa). In addition a Junior Kangaroos vs. Junior Kiwis (Under 20s) game was also played as a curtain raiser to the ANZAC test Curtis Scott and Brodie Croft were selected to play for the Junior Kangaroos with Croft chosen as captain. Players that were selected in the squads but did not play are not listed.

2: Players listed here have played at least one World Cup match for their nation. Australia named 7 Storm players including Felise Kaufusi who earlier this year played for Tonga.

Squad statistics 
Statistics Source: and
 Statistics Current to the end of the 2017 NRL regular season (this table does not include finals matches)

Scorers

Most Points in a Game: 22 points 
 Round 25: Cameron Smith (1 Try, 9 Goals) vs. South Sydney Rabbitohs

NOTE: This score was a new personal best by Cameron Smith

Most tries in a Game: 3 
 Round 24: Brodie Croft vs. Newcastle Knights
 Round 25: Suliasi Vunivalu vs. South Sydney Rabbitohs (incl Penalty Try)
 Round 25: Josh Addo-Carr vs. South Sydney Rabbitohs

Winning Games

Highest score in a winning game: 64 points
 Round 25 vs. South Sydney Rabbitohs

Lowest score in a winning game: 12 points
 Round 1 vs. Canterbury Bankstown Bulldogs

Greatest winning margin: 58 points
 Round 25 vs. South Sydney Rabbitohs

Greatest number of Games won consecutively: 10
 Round 20 to 2017 Grand Final (unbroken streak)

Losing Games

Highest score in a losing game: 36 points
 Round 10 vs. Gold Coast Titans
NOTE: This equalled the league record for the highest score in a losing game.

Lowest score in a losing game: 2 points
 Round 6 vs. Cronulla Sharks

Greatest losing margin: 16 points
 Round 18 vs. Parramatta Eels

Greatest number of Games lost consecutively: 1
 Round 6, Round 10, Round 16, Round 18

Jersey
In November 2016, the club announced that it had signed a new deal with ISC to provide all their high quality apparel to Storm players, coaches, staff and fans for the next five years. They also announced that while the ISC logo will now appear in the jersey the actual design of the home and away strips will remain the same from 2016. Melbourne Storm only 12 months earlier signed a five-year deal with Star Athletic to provide all of its apparel; however it is unclear as to why this deal ended after only one year.

# ISC Marvel Heroes promotional jersey designed to look like Thor. 
^ Added ANZAC Appeal logo.
^^ Designed by Dixon Patten.
% Replica of 2007 NRL Grand Final jersey.
& Women in League jersey — similar design to the eventual 2018 clash jersey, but in navy and pink.
@ Home jersey with added logos celebrating Cameron Smith breaking Darren Lockyer's NRL games record.

Awards

Trophy Cabinet
2017 J. J. Giltinan Shield
 2017 Provan-Summons Trophy
 2017 Michael Moore Trophy

Melbourne Storm Awards Night
Held at Crown Palladium on Tuesday 3 October.
 Melbourne Storm Player of the Year: Cameron Smith
 Melbourne Storm Rookie of the Year: Curtis Scott
 Melbourne Storm Members' Player of Year: Cameron Smith
 Melbourne Storm Most Improved: Felise Kaufusi
 Melbourne Storm Best Back: Will Chambers
 Melbourne Storm Best Forward: Jesse Bromwich
Cooper Cronk Feeder Club Player of the Year: Brodie Croft
 Darren Bell U20s Player of the Year: Harry Grant
 U20s Best Forward: Louis Geraghty 
 U20's Best Back: Jesse Arthurs
 Greg Brentnall Young Achievers Trophy: Jordin Leiu
 Michael Moore Club Person of the Year: Cooper Cronk
 Life Member Inductee: Frank Ponnisi
 Chairman's Award: Daniel Giese
 Best try: Kenny Bromwich, qualifying final v Parramatta

Dally M Awards Night
Melbourne Storm players walked away from rugby league's Dally M awards on 27 September 2017 with a total of six Dally M awards.
 Dally M Medal: Cameron Smith
 Dally M Captain of the Year: Cameron Smith
 Dally M Coach of the Year: Craig Bellamy
 Dally M Fullback of the Year: Billy Slater
 Dally M Hooker of the Year: Cameron Smith
 Dally M Top Try Scorer (Regular season): Suliasi Vunivalu

Rugby League Players Association Awards Night
 RLPA Hooker of the Year: Cameron Smith
 RLPA NYC Player of the Year: Harry Grant
 RLPA Australian Representative Player of the Year: Cameron Smith

Rugby League World Golden Boot Awards Night
 Golden Boot Award: Cameron Smith

Additional Awards
 I Don't Quit Iron Bar: Brandon Smith
 Clive Churchill Medal: Billy Slater
 Sprit of ANZAC Medal: Nelson Asofa-Solomona
 New Zealand Kiwi Rookie of the Year: Nelson Asofa-Solomona

References

Melbourne Storm seasons
Melbourne Storm season